Myint Swe  (born 18 March 1965) is a Burmese politician and military officer who currently serves as a military representative for Amyotha Hluttaw. He is a member of Amyotha Hluttaw Women and Children's Rights Committee.

Early life and education
Myint Swe was born on 18 March 1965 in Hmawbi, Yangon Region, Myanmar. He graduated with B.Sc from Yangon University. Myint Swe is a major at Myanmar Army, military officer.

References

Burmese politicians
1965 births
Living people
People from Yangon Region